Mimoblennius rusi, the Rusi blenny, is a species of combtooth blenny found in the western Indian ocean.  This species grows to a length of  SL. The specific name is an acronym which stands for the J.L.B. Smith Institute of Ichthyology, Rhodes University where the holotype and paratypes are retained.

References

rusi
Fish described in 1978
Taxa named by Victor G. Springer